2021 ACC tournament may refer to:

 2021 ACC men's basketball tournament
 2021 ACC women's basketball tournament
 2021 ACC men's soccer tournament